Nowhere to Run may refer to:

Film and television 
 Nowhere to Run (1989 film), an American film directed by Carl Franklin
 Nowhere to Run (1993 film), an American action film starring Jean-Claude Van Damme
 Nowhere to Run (1978 film), an American TV film starring David Janssen
 Nowhere to Run (2015 film), a Chinese film directed by Wang Mengyuan
 Nowhere to Run, a documentary film by Anthony Sherwood
 Nowhere to Run, a video compilation of episodes of Animorphs
 "Nowhere to Run" (Highlander: The Series), an episode of Highlander: The Series
 "Nowhere to Run", an episode of Blue Heelers
 "Nowhere to Run", an episode of Degrassi: The Next Generation
 "Nowhere to Run", an episode of Gunsmoke
 "Nowhere to Run", an episode of Instant Star
 2048: Nowhere to Run (2017 short film), a film set in the Blade Runner universe

Music

Songs
 "Nowhere to Run" (song), by Martha and the Vandellas
 "Nowhere to Run", by The Crystal Method and others from the soundtrack album Chef Aid: The South Park Album
 "Nowhere to Run", by Fozzy
 "Nowhere to Run", by Girlschool from Running Wild
 "Nowhere to Run", by J. J. Cale from Naturally
 "Nowhere to Run", by Jon Oliva's Pain from 'Tage Mahal
 "Nowhere to Run", by Kiss from Killers
 "Nowhere to Run", by The Korgis from Sticky George
 "Nowhere to Run", by Lillix from Tigerlily
 "Nowhere to Run", by Pete Townshend and Ronnie Lane from Rough Mix
 "Nowhere to Run", by Santana from Shangó
 "No Where to Run", by King Gordy from King of Horrorcore

Albums
 Nowhere to Run, by 50 Lions
 Nowhere to Run, by Agression
 Nowhere to Run, by Chron Gen
 Nowhere to Run, by Ted Hawkins
 Nowhere to Run, by Under the Gun

Other media 
 Nowhere to Run, a Hardy Boys Casefiles novel
 Nowhere to Run, a novel in the Teen Power Inc. series
 Nowhere to Run, the first novel in Series Three (Unstoppable) of The 39 Clues
 Spy Hunter: Nowhere to Run (video game), a 2006 racing game

See also 
 "Nowhere to Run, Nowhere to Hide", song by Gravediggaz, interpolating the Martha and the Vandellas song